Forcipiger is a genus of fish in the family Chaetodontidae, the butterflyfishes. It is distributed throughout the Indo-Pacific region. The name of this genus means “bearing forceps” and is a reference to the long, slender snouts of the species in this genus.

Species
There are currently three recognized species in this genus:
 Forcipiger flavissimus D. S. Jordan & E. A. McGregor, 1898 – yellow longnose butterflyfish
 Forcipiger longirostris (Broussonet, 1782) – longnose butterflyfish
 Forcipiger wanai G. R. Allen, Erdmann & Sbrocco, 2012

Some authorities recognise a fourth species, F. cyrano,  but this taxon is not treated as valid by Fishbase.

Gallery

References

Chaetodontidae
Marine fish genera
Taxa named by David Starr Jordan